Hokejski klub Alfa, commonly referred to as HK Alfa or simply Alfa, was an ice hockey club from Ljubljana, Slovenia. The club was established in 2005 and dissolved in 2009.

References

Ice hockey clubs established in 2005
Defunct ice hockey teams in Slovenia
Sports clubs in Ljubljana
2005 establishments in Slovenia
Ice hockey clubs disestablished in 2009
2009 disestablishments in Slovenia
Slovenian Ice Hockey League teams